Leida Tigane (21 May 1908 Tartu – 13 February 1983 Tallinn) was an Estonian prose and children's writer.

In 1927, she graduated from Girls' Gymnasium of Estonian Youth Education Society. After that, she had several jobs: working for the scientific publisher Teaduslik Kirjandus, working for the newspaper Postimees, and working for the cultural newspaper Sirp ja Vasar.

From 1949, she was a member of CPSU.

Works
 "Hunt ja kutsikas" (1948)
 "Jutte lastele" (1955)
 "Lugu kahest laisast varesest" (1959)
 "Mina oskan paremini" (1952)
 "Peremees ja sulane" (1958)
 "Seitse pastlapaari" (1974)
 "Tera siit ja teine sealt" (1968)
 "Vanaema maja" (1946)
 "Vikerkaar"
 "Sõber meriröövel"
 "Palun seda härrat"

References

1908 births
1983 deaths
20th-century Estonian women writers
Estonian children's writers
Estonian women children's writers
Estonian women short story writers
Writers from Tartu